Hugo Arsenio González (born 14 December 1948) is a Paraguayan former professional footballer who played as a striker. He notably played for Cerro Porteño, Red Star, and the Paraguay national team.

Club career 
González began his career at Paraguayan club Cerro Porteño in 1969, and signed for French club Red Star in 1971. In his first two seasons at Red Star, the club played in the Division 1. However, they were relegated to the Division 2 at the end of the 1972–73 season. González played a key part in l'étoile rouge's promotion back to the top-flight, as he scored 14 goals in 25 matches in the league in the 1973–74 season. In that campaign, he formed a remarkable partnership in attack with Néstor Combin, with the pair combining for a total of 39 goals.

In the Coupe de France, González helped his side reach the quarter-finals on two occasions: in 1972–73 and in 1973–74. He left Red Star in 1975 after four seasons, his tally adding up to 31 goals in 94 league matches, and 33 goals in total in all competitions.

In 1977, González returned to Cerro Porteño. He retired there in 1979.

International career
González made eleven appearances for Paraguay.

Managerial career 
In the 1980s, González had short spells as manager of Cerro Porteño, the club for which he formerly played.

Honours 
Cerro Porteño
 Paraguayan Primera División: 1970, 1977

References

External links
 
 

1948 births
Living people
People from Paraguarí Department
Paraguayan footballers
Association football forwards
Cerro Porteño players
Red Star F.C. players
Paraguayan Primera División players
Ligue 1 players
Ligue 2 players
Paraguay international footballers
Paraguayan expatriate footballers
Expatriate footballers in France
Paraguayan expatriate sportspeople in France
Cerro Porteño managers
Sportivo Luqueño managers